August-Graf-von-Platen-Preis is a Bavarian literary prize. It is named after August Graf von Platen (1796–1835).

Literary awards of Bavaria